Skyline Restaurant (formerly The Speck) is a diner in northwest Portland, Oregon. The restaurant's burgers and milkshakes have received a generally positive reception.

See also
 List of diners

References

External links

 
 Skyline Restaurant at the Food Network
 Skyline Restaurant at Thrillist
 Skyline Burgers at Zomato

Diners in Portland, Oregon
Northwest Portland, Oregon
Year of establishment missing